Maurizio Melina (born 15 July 1975) is an Italian footballer. He plays for SC Cham.

Melina started his career at FC Luzern in Swiss Super League. He then spent 10 seasons for SC Kriens in Swiss Challenge League, except on loan to FC Sion in Super League.

On 20 July 2006, he left for SC Cham in 1. Liga. He followed the club promoted in the next season.

External links
 

Italian footballers
FC Luzern players
SC Kriens players
FC Sion players
Swiss Super League players
Association football forwards
1975 births
Living people
SC Cham players
Place of birth missing (living people)